Mungrisdale is a small village and civil parish in the north east of the English Lake District in Cumbria.  It is also the name of the valley in which the village sits. 
Mungrisdale is a popular starting point for ascents of the nearby hills, such as Bowscale Fell, Bannerdale Crags and Souther Fell. It lies on the River Glenderamackin, a tributary of the Greta.

Mungrisdale has no local amenities except for the Grade II* listed St Kentigern's Church built in 1756, a village hall and a pub, the Mill Inn.  

The civil parish of Mungrisdale is made up of the hamlets of Berrier, Bowscale, Haltcliff Bridge, Heggle Lane, Hutton Roof, Mosedale, Mungrisdale and Murrah.  The parish had a population of 284 in 2001, increasing to 297 at the 2011 Census.

See also

Listed buildings in Mungrisdale
Mungrisdale Common

References

External links

 Cumbria County History Trust: Mungrisdale (nb: provisional research only – see Talk page)
Mungrisdale village website

 
Villages in Cumbria
Civil parishes in Cumbria
Eden District